West Bradenton is an unincorporated area and census-designated place (CDP) in Manatee County, Florida, United States. The population was 4,247 at the 2020 census. It is part of the Bradenton–Sarasota–Venice Metropolitan Statistical Area.

Geography
West Bradenton is located at  (27.500916, -82.613806). It is bordered to the east by the city of Bradenton, to the north by the Manatee River, an arm of Tampa Bay, and to the south by Florida State Road 64. The CDP extends west as far as Warner West Bayou and 67th Street NW. The unincorporated community of Palma Sola is to the west.

Demographics

As of the census of 2000, there were 4,444 people, 1,698 households, and 1,292 families residing in the CDP. The racial makeup of the CDP was 97.05% White, 0.52% African American, 0.18% Native American, 0.92% Asian, 0.05% Pacific Islander, 0.41% from other races, and 0.88% from two or more races. Hispanic or Latino of any race were 2.68% of the population.

There were 1,698 households, out of which 34.1% had children under the age of 18 living with them, 63.7% were married couples living together, 9.4% had a female householder with no husband present, and 23.9% were non-families. 19.4% of all households were made up of individuals, and 9.0% had someone living alone who was 65 years of age or older. The average household size was 2.62 and the average family size was 3.00.

In the CDP, the population was spread out, with 25.4% under the age of 18, 5.0% from 18 to 24, 25.9% from 25 to 44, 27.5% from 45 to 64, and 16.2% who were 65 years of age or older. The median age was 41 years. For every 100 females, there were 91.1 males. For every 100 females age 18 and over, there were 89.8 males.

The median income for a household in the CDP was $52,989, and the median income for a family was $57,400. Males had a median income of $38,168 versus $24,471 for females. The per capita income for the CDP was $27,262. About 3.3% of families and 5.2% of the population were below the poverty line, including 4.9% of those under age 18 and 4.8% of those age 65 or over.

References

Census-designated places in Manatee County, Florida
Sarasota metropolitan area
Census-designated places in Florida